The 2013 Queensland Firebirds season saw Queensland Firebirds compete in the 2013 ANZ Championship. During the regular season Firebirds finished fourth, qualifying for the playoffs. In the minor semi-final they defeated   53–50  and in the preliminary final they defeated  50–46.

Players

Player movements

2013 roster

Debutants
 Abbey McCulloch, Kim Ravaillion and Gabi Simpson all made their ANZ Championship and Firebirds debuts in the Round 1 match against Southern Steel.
 Laura Clemesha made her ANZ Championship and Firebirds debuts in the Round 8 match against Canterbury Tactix.

Melbourne Vixens Summer Challenge
The main pre-season event was the Summer Challenge, hosted by Melbourne Vixens at the State Netball Hockey Centre on 23 and 24 February.  were unbeaten, winning all three of their games.

Regular season

Fixtures and results
Round 1

Round 2

Round 3

Round 4

Round 5
Queensland Firebirds received a bye.
Round 6

Round 7

Round 8

Round 9

Round 10

Round 11

Round 12

Round 13

Round 14

Final table

Finals

Minor semi-final

Preliminary final

Grand final

References

Queensland Firebirds seasons
Queensland Firebirds